Stephen McAnespie (born 1 February 1972) is a Scottish football coach and former professional football.

As a player, he was a defender who notably played in the Premier League for Bolton Wanderers and in the Scottish Premiership for Aberdeen, Raith Rovers and Partick Thistle. He also played in the Football League with Fulham, Bradford City and Cambridge United.

Following retirement, McAnespie emigrated to the United States and worked as assistant coach of the New Orleans Shell Shockers before taking over as head coach of the Indiana Invaders in 2005.

Playing career
Born in Kilmarnock, McAnespie started his career with Aberdeen, although failed to make a senior appearance during his time at Pittodrie.

In 1994, after five years with Aberdeen, he signed for Raith Rovers, with whom he won the Scottish League Cup within a matter of months, going on to also win the Scottish First Division. He also featured in the early stages of Raith's maiden European campaign.

McAnespie moved to Bolton Wanderers in September 1995 for £900,000 (to this day a record transfer fee received by Raith Rovers), featuring in around a dozen matches as Bolton were relegated to the Football League First Division. McAnespie featured in a similar number of matches as Bolton gained promotion at the first attempt, winning the title by eighteen points. He played in a handful of matches at the start of the 1997–98 season.

McAnespie dropped down to the Football League Second Division in November 1997 to join Fulham in a £100,000 deal. After three years with the London side, McAnespie made just seven league appearances, playing in just three matches of Fulham's title-winning 1998–99 season, having spent part of the previous season on loan at Bradford City.

At the start of the 2000–01 season, McAnespie joined Cambridge United on a free transfer.

He joined Partick Thistle on a similar deal in March 2002, weeks before Cambridge's relegation from the Football League Second Division, and played a small part in Partick's Scottish First Division title win.

Coaching career
He then moved to the US to coach football. While he was assistant coach of the New Orleans Shell Shockers, he had to be rescued from the impact of Hurricane Katrina. He later became the head coach of the Indiana Invaders.

McAnespie moved to New Orleans as head coach at Brother Martin High School.

Honours
Raith Rovers
 Scottish League Cup: 1994–95
 Scottish First Division: 1994–95

Bolton Wanderers
 Football League First Division: 1996–97

References

External links
 
 

1972 births
Living people
Footballers from Kilmarnock
Scottish footballers
Scottish football managers
Aberdeen F.C. players
Raith Rovers F.C. players
Bolton Wanderers F.C. players
Fulham F.C. players
Bradford City A.F.C. players
Cambridge United F.C. players
Partick Thistle F.C. players
New Orleans Shell Shockers players
Scottish Football League players
English Football League players
Premier League players
Association football fullbacks
USL League Two players
Scotland youth international footballers
Scottish expatriate sportspeople in the United States
Expatriate soccer players in the United States
Scottish expatriate footballers
Scottish expatriate football managers